Zechner is a surname. Notable people with the surname include:

Ingo Zechner (born 1972), Austrian philosopher and historian
Irene Zechner, Austrian luger
Michael Zechner (born 1975), Austrian footballer
Olivia Zechner (born 1981), Austrian pilot

See also
Lechner
Zeichner